The Stanovoy Range (Stanovoy khrebet;), is a mountain range located in the Sakha Republic and Amur Oblast, Far Eastern Federal District. It is also known as Sükebayatur and Sükhbaatar in Mongolian, or the Stanovoy Mountains, or Outer Khingan Range in English. The range was first studied and scientifically described by Russian researcher Alexander von Middendorff.

History
The range formed the border between Russia and China from 1689 (Treaty of Nerchinsk) to 1858 (Treaty of Aigun).

Etymology
The Evenks grouped the Dzhugdzhur, Stanovoy, and Yablonoi ranges under the name "Dzhugdzhur". In Evenk folklore this mountain system is known as the "backbone of the Earth".

Geography
It is bound by the Olyokma River in the west and the Uchur River in the east, which separates it from the Dzhugdzhur Range in Khabarovsk Krai to the east. The Aldan Highlands are located to the north of the eastern part of the range and the Olyokma-Chara Plateau to the northwest. The Yankan – Tukuringra – Soktakhan – Dzhagdy group of mountain ranges rise to the south and the Maya Range to the southeast.

Hydrography
The Stanovoy Range separates the watershed of the Arctic Ocean (basin of the Lena) from that of the Pacific Ocean (Amur basin). 
The range has many glaciers, which are among the main sources of the Lena. Rivers Maya and Timpton have their sources in the range. The Zeya has its sources in the Toko-Stanovik subrange located at the eastern end.

See also
List of mountains and hills of Russia

References

External links
 
 Stanovoi on Peakware

South Siberian Mountains
Physiographic provinces
Mountain ranges of the Sakha Republic